Zemestaneh (also Romanized as Zemestāneh and Zamastāneh; also known as Zamīnīstān) is a village in Poshtkuh-e Mugui Rural District, in the Central District of Fereydunshahr County, Isfahan Province, Iran. At the 2006 census, its population was 122, in 28 families.

References 

Populated places in Fereydunshahr County